Yakshagana poetry (Kannada:ಯಕ್ಷಗಾನ ಪ್ರಸ೦ಗ, pronounced as yaksha-gaana prasanga)(Yakshagana Padya or Yakshagana Prasanga) is a collection of Kannada poems used to enact a music dance drama called Yakshagana. The poems are composed in well known Kannada metres using the frame work of Yakshagana Raga and Yakshagana Tala. Yakshagana also has what is called a Yakshagana metre. The collection of Yakshagana poems forming a musical drama is called a Prasanga. Oldest surviving parasanga books are believed to have been composed in the 15th century. Many compositions have been lost. There are evidences to show that oral compositions were in use before the 15th century.

There are more than 300 Yakshagana Prasanga books available today. Attempts are being made to preserve the texts by digitising them.

Some famous Prasangas

GadhayuddhaKrishna sandhanaBasmasura MohiniRatnavati KalyanaBhishma VijayaChandrahasa CharitreAbhimanyu KalayaSudhanva KalagaSugreeva Vijayam''' ((Andhra Yakshaganamu) Telugu - 1570) Kandukuru Rudra Kavi

See also

Kannada literature
Yaksha Prasanga Kosha
Prasanga Prathi Sangraha
Android app to view/download Yakshagana Prasanga Books

References

External links
A list of known compositions

Yakshagana
 
History of literature in India
Indian poetry by language
Literature of Karnataka
Indian poetics